Hogar, dulce hogar (English: Home, sweet home) is a 1941  Argentine film written and directed by Luis Moglia Barth.

Cast
In alphabetical order
Olinda Bozán		
Baby Correa
José De Angelis		
Floren Delbene	
María Esther Gamas		
Fanny Navarro		
José Otal		
Raimundo Pastore	
María Esther Podestá		
Jorge Villoldo	... 	Lechero

References

External links

1941 films
1940s Spanish-language films
Films directed by Luis Moglia Barth
Argentine black-and-white films
1940s Argentine films